Thomas Edison (1847–1931) was an American inventor and businessman.

Edison may also refer to:

 Edison (name), including people with the name

Places
Edison, California, USA
Edison, Georgia, USA
Edison, Nebraska, USA
Edison, New Jersey, USA
Edison, Ohio, USA
Edison, Washington (state), USA
Edison, West Virginia, USA
Edison Township, Swift County, Minnesota, USA
Edison Park, Chicago, Illinois, USA

Facilities and structures
 Edison State Park, the site of Thomas Edison's Menlo Park Laboratory
 Thomas Alva Edison Memorial Tower and Museum, Edison, New Jersey
 Edison (Monterrey Metro), Monterrey, Mexico
 The Edison, a Los Angeles nightclub

Education
 Edison High School (New Jersey), Edison, New Jersey
 Edison Tech Center, interactive learning center in Schenectady, New York
 Thomas Edison State University, Trenton, New Jersey

Companies and organizations
 Electrical utility, the power company, sometimes called an "Edison"
 Consolidated Edison, several different Edisons of New York City combined, an electrical utility
 Commonwealth Edison, an electric company in Illinois
 Edison S.p.A., an Italian energy company
 Southern California Edison, an electrical utility serving Southern California
 Edison International, its parent company
 Edison General Electric, founded by Thomas Edison
 Edison Machine Works, founded by Thomas Edison
 Edison Records, record label company founded by Edison
 Edison Studios, pioneering film company owned by Edison

Arts, entertainment, media
 Edison, an audio editing plug-in for FL Studio
 Edison (poem), a 1927 epic poem by Vítězslav Nezval
 Edison Awards (India), Tamil film industry awards
 Edison (film), a 2005 film directed by David J. Burke
 Edison Award, a music award in the Netherlands
 Edison, a later name of the band Edison Lighthouse
 Edison Glass or Edison, a band

Computing
 Edison (programming language)
 Edison (software), a PC energy monitoring application by Verdiem Corporation
 Intel Edison, a tiny dual-core computer offered as a development system

Transportation and vehicles
 USS Edison (DD-439), a United States destroyer
 Edison, a train operated as part of the Clocker service
 Edison, a vehicle-to-grid research project in Denmark

Other uses
 Edison Awards, a technological prize in the United States
 Edison (crater), a lunar crater

See also

 Edison Bridge (disambiguation), various locations